Phillip Eugene "Dutch" Marion (June 18, 1902 – June 1985) was a professional American football player for the Detroit Panthers. He attended Washington & Jefferson College and University of Michigan.

References

External links
 

1902 births
1985 deaths
American football fullbacks
Detroit Panthers players
Michigan Wolverines football players
Washington & Jefferson Presidents football players
Players of American football from Chicago